The 2009 Miami Beach Polo World Cup was played in Miami Beach, Florida, as a World Polo Tour Cup event, from May 1 to May 3, 2009.

Participating teams

Results

Day 1
Miami Beach Polo World Cup V
Scores, May 1, 2009
Day 1 of 3

Game 1: Black Watch/Nespresso 13; Comcast/China Grill Management 4

Game 2: Bombay Sapphire 6; Audi 4

Game 3: The Villages 10; The Setai 9

Day 2
Miami Beach Polo World Cup V
Scores, May 2, 2009
Day 2 of 3

Game 4: Black Watch/Nespresso 11; The Setai 6

Game 5: Bombay Sapphire 11; Comcast/China Grill Management 3

Game 6: Audi 8; The Villages 6

Day 3
Miami Beach Polo World Cup V
Scores, May 3, 2009
Day 3 of 3

Game 7: The Villages 8; Comcast/China Grill Management 3

Game 8: Audi 6; The Setai 4

Game 9: Bombay Sapphire 6; Black Watch/Nespresso 5

Most Valuable Player: John Gobin

Best Playing Pony: Reina, 12-year-old Chestnut mare owned by John and Kathleen Gobin, played by John Gobin.

Champions: Bombay Sapphire.

External links
 Pololine

Polo competitions in the United States
Miami Beach Polo World Cup, 2009